Iron District Stadium is an 8,000-seat soccer-specific stadium currently under construction in Milwaukee, Wisconsin. Once completed it will be home to the city's yet-to-be-named USL Championship club and the Marquette Golden Eagles soccer and lacrosse teams. The stadium will be located in the city's Westown neighborhood on the corner of N. 6th St. and W. Michigan St. and is expected to be complete in 2024.

History
The stadium was first announced in May 2022 as part of the larger Iron District sports and entertainment district development which will also include housing, a 3,500-seat concert venue, and retail space. The 11-acre property on which the district will be built was purchased from Marquette University. 

Initial construction on the development began in September 2022. At the official unveiling event for the USL Championship club on October 19, 2022, it was announced that work on the stadium had already begun, including the demolition of the abandoned Ramada Inn which stood on the property. Structural work was expected to begin by the end of 2022.

References

Sports venues in Milwaukee
USL Championship stadiums
Soccer venues in Wisconsin
Marquette Golden Eagles soccer
College soccer venues in the United States
College lacrosse venues in the United States
Stadiums under construction in the United States